The Chalmers Lindholmen University College or Chalmers Lindholmen was a university college, and an affiliate of Chalmers University of Technology, located in Gothenburg, Sweden. The campus is located at Lindholmen on the island Hisingen. As of 2005, Chalmers Lindholmen no longer exists as a separate organisation. Campus Lindholmen is now one of Chalmers' two campuses.

Schools 
The organization is divided into schools.

School of Engineering
School of Maritime Studies
School of Continuing and Professional Learning
Centre of Research and Development

Students
Around 2,700 undergraduate students are attending Chalmers Lindholmen University College.

Bachelor's degrees
Building and Civil Engineering
Building Technology, Business Development and Entrepreneurship
Computer Engineering
Design Engineering
Electrical and Electronical Engineering
Mechanical Engineering
Mechatronics Engineering
Marine Engineering
Nautical Science
Shipping and Logistics

Master's degrees
 Interaction Design and Technologies
 Software Engineering and Technology

See also
Chalmers Students' Union
Lindholmen Science Park

External links
Chalmers Lindholmen University College – Official site

Lindholmen University College
Universities and colleges in Sweden
Higher education in Gothenburg
Hisingen